Oliva todosina, common name the pretty olive, is a species of sea snail, a marine gastropod mollusk in the family Olividae, the olives.

Subspecies
 Oliva todosina solomonensis Petuch & Sargent, 1986
 Oliva todosina todosina Duclos, 1840

Description
The length of the shell varies between 14 mm and 28 mm.

Distribution
This marine species occurs off Madagascar and in the Bay of Bengal; also off Japan, Micronesia and Polynesia.

References

 Liu, J.Y. [Ruiyu] (ed.). (2008). Checklist of marine biota of China seas. China Science Press. 1267 pp
 Vervaet F.L.J. (2018). The living Olividae species as described by Pierre-Louis Duclos. Vita Malacologica. 17: 1-111
 Steyn, D.G & Lussi, M. (2005). Offshore Shells of Southern Africa: A pictorial guide to more than 750 Gastropods. Published by the authors. Pp. i–vi, 1–

External links
 Duclos, P. L. (1835-1840). Histoire naturelle générale et particulière de tous les genres de coquilles univalves marines a l'état vivant et fossile publiée par monographie. Genre Olive. Paris: Institut de France. 33 plates: pls 1-12

todosina
Gastropods described in 1840